L. Michael Whitby is a British ancient historian of Late Antiquity. He specialises in late Roman history, early Byzantine history and historiography. He is currently pro-vice-chancellor and head of the College of Arts and Law at the University of Birmingham.

Early life
Whitby read Literae Humaniores at Corpus Christi College, University of Oxford. He then spent three years working as a civil servant in the Scottish Office. He returned to Oxford to conduct postgraduate study in Byzantine history.

Academic career
Whitby held a junior research fellowship at Merton College, Oxford. In 1987, he joined the Ancient History department at the University of St Andrews. He became head of department in 1993 and received a personal chair in 1995 as Professor of Ancient History.

He was Professor of Classics and Ancient History at the University of Warwick, having joined the Department of Classics and Ancient History in 1996. He also served as pro-vice-chancellor 'Teaching, Learning and Quality' from 2003, and then 'Academic Planning and Resources'.

On 1 September 2010, he became pro-vice-chancellor and head of College of Arts and Law at the University of Birmingham.

Honours
In 2007, Whitby was awarded a Doctor of Letters (DLitt) honorary degree by the University of Warwick. He received one of the 2009 Distinguished Book Awards from the Society for Military History for The Cambridge History of Greek and Roman Warfare.

Works

The Emperor Maurice and his Historian: Theophylact Simocatta on Persian and Balkan Warfare (1988).
Chronicon Paschale 284–628 AD (1989), with Mary Whitby.
The Cambridge Ancient History XIV; AD 425–600 (2000), co-editor.
Rome at War AD 293–696 (2002).
The Cambridge History of Ancient Warfare (2005), co-editor.
Christian Persecution, Martyrdom and Orthodoxy (2006).
Sparta. New York: Routledge (2002).

References

Living people
British historians
Academics of the University of Birmingham
Alumni of Corpus Christi College, Oxford
Academics of the University of Warwick
Academics of the University of St Andrews
Year of birth missing (living people)